The NS Class 600 were a class of 65 shunting locomotives built by English Electric in England between 1950–1957 for Nederlandse Spoorwegen (NS). The first 10 were built at Dick, Kerr & Co, Preston and the remaining 55 at Vulcan Foundry, Newton-le-Willows. They are very similar to the British Rail Class 11. Twenty-three locomotives were later fitted with radio remote-control, and renumbered in the range 671–693.

In 2013 there are still two locomotives active daily in The Netherlands. One is active for Railpro in Crailoo and the other is active for LOCON Benelux in Apeldoorn.

Class 500
There was also the similar NS Class 500.

The first ten locomotives of the class 500 were built for the War Department and were taken on by NS after the war after service in Europe. NS subsequently placed orders for a further 35 locomotives. There was also an order for 15 locomotives to be delivered without engines that would have an alternative engine fitted in the Netherlands. These were numbered as 451-465 briefly before being renumbered to 701–715.

Post-NS use
This class was withdrawn by NS in the early 2000s. Many have been preserved, including several which have been repatriated to England.

Some are still in use by the private company Rotterdam Rail Feeding in the Netherlands.

Privately owned 663 was moved from the Dartmoor Railway to the NRM annex at Shildon on 17 October 2006 to take up pilot duties.  As of 2012 it has been at the Ribble Steam Railway in Preston, where it first worked after repatriation in 2005. Although part way through a repaint 663 is in running order.

Modelling
There is a well known and accurate H0 scale model offered in various liveries by Roco.

References 

0600
English Electric locomotives
C locomotives
Standard gauge locomotives of the Netherlands
Diesel-electric locomotives of the Netherlands
Railway locomotives introduced in 1950